The 2003 Volvo Women's Open was a women's tennis tournament played on outdoor hard courts in Pattaya, Thailand. It was part of Tier V of the 2003 WTA Tour. It was the 13th edition of the tournament and was held from 3 November through 9 November 2003. Unseeded Henrieta Nagyová won the singles title, her second at the event after 1997, and earned $16,000 first-prize money.

Finals

Singles
 Henrieta Nagyová defeated  Ľubomíra Kurhajcová, 6–4, 6–2
 This was Nagyová's 1st singles title of the year and the 9th and last of her career.

Doubles
 Li Ting /  Sun Tiantian defeated  Wynne Prakusya /  Angelique Widjaja, 6–4, 6–3

References

External links
 ITF tournament edition details 
 Tournament draws

 
 WTA Tour
 in women's tennis
Tennis, WTA Tour, Volvo Women's Open
Tennis, WTA Tour, Volvo Women's Open

Tennis, WTA Tour, Volvo Women's Open